The 2010 Europe Cup in badminton was the 33rd edition of the Europe Cup. It was held between June 23–27, 2010, in the ZBC-Hal, in Zwolle, Netherlands. 1.BC Saarbrücken won the tournament for the first time.

Draw
The draw was held on June 14, 2010 at Zwolle, Netherlands.

Format
21 teams competed for the title. They were split into 4 groups of 4 teams and 1 group with 5 teams. The Top team of each group advanced to the Quarterfinals. The winners of group A, B and D had a Bye to the Semifinals while the winners of Group C and E played against each other for the final spot in the Semis.

Group stage

Group E

Knockout stage

References
Schedule & Results

External links
Official website

Europe Cup (badminton)
Europe Cup
2010 in Dutch sport
Badminton tournaments in the Netherlands
International sports competitions hosted by the Netherlands
Sports competitions in Zwolle